Envoplakin is a protein that in humans is encoded by the EVPL gene.

Interactions
Envoplakin has been shown to interact with PPL.

See also 
 List of target antigens in pemphigus

References

Further reading

Plakins